Miss Bluebeard is a 1925 American silent comedy film directed by Frank Tuttle and starring Bebe Daniels. It is based on a play, Little Miss Bluebeard, by Avery Hopwood.

Synopsis
Larry Charters is a composer who is visiting Paris, and is exhausted from so many women wanting to meet him and ask for his autograph. When he is about to leave and head back home, he asks his friend Bob to stem the tide of admiring ladies rushing his hotel door by pretending to be him. Larry takes off, and Bob does his best to pretend he is Larry. But Colette, an actress who inadvertently causes Bob to miss the boat train, finds that she gets more than she bargained for by befriending "Larry".  While looking for a room for the night, the inebriated Mayor accidentally marries them as Mr. and Mrs. Charters.  Undeterred, the couple meet up with the real Larry in London the next day. 

Larry has more girl-trouble with two women admirers nearly meeting in the hallway, one of whom is Lulu, who is nearly psychotically jealous of any other woman. Bertie Bird, who seems to do nothing more than sleep, is one of Larry's friends, and who asks for a key to his guest room so he can get a good night's sleep, after his napping all day.  When Bob and Colette arrive, it is apparent that Larry and she fall in love instantly, but are too embarrassed to admit it, especially as she is married to Bob, although under Larry's name. Things get even more complex when Colette goes to bed in the guest bedroom, and is joined under the covers by Bertie. Suddenly Colette is branded as the Female Bluebeard, since she is "married" three times, albeit by three very tenuous means.

Cast

Bebe Daniels as Colette Girard
Robert Frazer as Larry Charters
Kenneth MacKenna as Bob Hawley
Raymond Griffith as The Honorable Bertie Bird
Martha O'Dwyer as Lulu  (credited as Martha Madison)
Diana Kane as Gloria Harding
Lawrence D'Orsay as Colonel Harding
Florence Billings as Eva
Ivan F. Simpson as Bounds (credited as Ivan Simpson)

Preservation
Prints of Miss Bluebeard are held in the BFI National Archive, UCLA Film and Television Archive, George Eastman Museum Motion Picture Collection, and Berkeley Art Museum and Pacific Film Archive.

See also
Her Wedding Night (1930)

References

External links

Lobby poster (Wayback Machine)
Stills at silentfilmstillarchive.com
Newspaper advertisement at silentsaregolden.com

1925 films
American silent feature films
Films directed by Frank Tuttle
American films based on plays
Paramount Pictures films
1926 comedy films
1926 films
Silent American comedy films
American black-and-white films
1925 comedy films
1920s English-language films
1920s American films
Films based on Bluebeard